Ben Pointer (born 25 May 1996) is an English professional rugby league footballer who plays as a  for the Midlands Hurricanes in RFL League 1.

Background
Pointer was born in England on 25 May 1996.

Career

London Broncos
Pointer played for the London Broncos in the Kingstone Press Championship.

Pointer has previously spent time on loan at the London Skolars.

Newcastle Thunder
Ahead of the 2018 season, Pointer joined the Newcastle Thunder after two loan spells with the London Skolars. He played 21 games that year, scoring 7 tries.

Sheffield Eagles
Following his successful stint in Betfred League 1, he joined Championship side Sheffield Eagles in October 2018. However, he left the club before the season began.

Coventry Bears
On 4 Feb 2021 it was reported that he had signed for the Coventry Bears in RFL League 1.

References

External links
Newcastle Thunder profile
London Broncos profile
London Skolars profile

1996 births
Living people
Coventry Bears players
English rugby league players
London Broncos players
London Skolars players
Newcastle Thunder players
Place of birth missing (living people)
Rugby league hookers
Sheffield Eagles players